NGC 6352 (also known as Caldwell 81) is a globular cluster of stars in the southern constellation of Ara, located approximately  from the Sun. It was discovered by Scottish astronomer James Dunlop on May 14, 1826. The cluster has a Shapley–Sawyer Concentration Class of XI:. A telescope with a  aperture is required to resolve the stars within this loose cluster.

This cluster is about 12.67 billion years old with two distinct stellar populations; the second generation is only around 10 million years younger than the first. The orbital motion of this cluster through the Milky Way suggests it is a member of the bulge or disk population. It is relatively metal-rich for an object of this class, having a metallicity of –0.70.

References

External links 
 

Globular clusters
Ara (constellation)
6352
081b